Mount Tadpole is a rounded and mostly ice-free mountain, about 1000 m, with a narrow ridge running southwest from the main mass. The mountain is 4 nautical miles (7 km) east-northeast of Mount Tuatara on the south side of Byrd Glacier. So named by Advisory Committee on Antarctic Names (US-ACAN) because of the appearance of the mountain.

Mountains of Oates Land